In mathematics, a binary operation or dyadic operation is a rule for combining two elements (called operands) to produce another element. More formally, a binary operation is an operation of arity two.

More specifically, an internal binary operation on a set is a binary operation whose two domains and the codomain are the same set.  Examples include the familiar arithmetic operations of addition, subtraction, and multiplication.  Other examples are readily found in different areas of mathematics, such as vector addition, matrix multiplication, and conjugation in groups.

An operation of arity two that involves several sets is sometimes also called a binary operation. For example, scalar multiplication of vector spaces takes a scalar and a vector to produce a vector, and scalar product takes two vectors to produce a scalar. Such binary operations may be called simply binary functions.

Binary operations are the keystone of most algebraic structures that are studied in algebra, in particular in semigroups, monoids, groups, rings, fields, and vector spaces.

Terminology
More precisely, a binary operation on a set  is a mapping of the elements of the Cartesian product  to :

If  is not a function, but a partial function, then  is called a partial binary operation. For instance, division of real numbers is a partial binary operation, because one can't divide by zero:  is undefined for every real number .

Sometimes, especially in computer science, the term binary operation is used for any binary function.

Properties and examples 
Typical examples of binary operations are the addition and multiplication of numbers and matrices as well as composition of functions on a single set.
For instance,
 On the set of real numbers ,  is a binary operation since the sum of two real numbers is a real number.
 On the set of natural numbers ,  is a binary operation since the sum of two natural numbers is a natural number.  This is a different binary operation than the previous one since the sets are different.
 On the set  of  matrices with real entries,  is a binary operation since the sum of two such matrices is a  matrix.
 On the set  of  matrices with real entries,  is a binary operation since the product of two such matrices is a  matrix.
 For a given set , let  be the set of all functions . Then  is a binary operation since the composition of the two functions is again a function on the set  (that is, a member of ).

Many also have identity elements and inverse elements.

The first three examples above are commutative and all of the above examples are associative.

On the set of real numbers , subtraction, that is, is a binary operation which is not commutative since, in general, .  It is also not associative, since, in general, ; for instance,  but .

On the set of natural numbers , the binary operation exponentiation, is not commutative since,  (cf. Equation xy = yx), and is also not associative since . For either set, this operation has a right identity (which is ) since  for all  in the set, which is not an identity (two sided identity) since  in general.

Division, a partial binary operation on the set of real or rational numbers, is not commutative or associative.  Tetration, as a binary operation on the natural numbers, is not commutative or associative and has no identity element.

Notation
Powers are usually also written without operator, but with the second argument as superscript.

Binary operations are sometimes written using prefix or (more frequently) postfix notation, both of which dispense with parentheses.  They are also called, respectively, Polish notation and reverse Polish notation.

Binary operations as ternary relations 

External binary operations 
This differs from a binary operation on a set in the sense in that  need not be ; its elements come from outside.

An example of an external binary operation is scalar multiplication in linear algebra.

It depends on authors whether it is considered as a binary operation.

See also

 :Category:Properties of binary operations
 Iterated binary operation
 Operator (programming)
 Ternary operation
 Truth table#Binary operations
 Unary operation
 Magma (algebra), a set equipped with a binary operation.

Notes

References

External links